Walter Lawrence Emden (1847 – 1913) was one of the leading English theatre and music hall architects in the building boom of 1885 to 1915.

Biography
Emden was the second son of William S. Emden, lessee of London's Olympic Theatre, and was born in the vicinity of the theatre in The Strand. Originally studying as a civil engineer, he joined architects Kelly and Lawes in 1870 in the burgeoning construction of theatres. He was immediately given the commission of designing the Globe Theatre. Emden also became a member of the Strand District Board of Works, a forerunner of local councils, and for seven years acted as chair. In 1890, he was elected to the London County Council.

In 1880, W. G. R. Sprague, a former pupil of Frank Matcham, joined Emden's practice as an apprentice for three years. From 1889, Emden entered a partnership with Charles J. Phipps building the Tivoli, Garrick Theatre and Duke of York's. His most important work, The Tivoli, in the Strand, became the archetype for music hall and variety theatre architecture.

His work extended to hotels, restaurants and, as it became popular, cinemas. He also had a younger half-brother, Henry (1852–1930), who was a leading scenic artist, painting the stage curtain for Walter's Trafalgar Theatre in 1892.

In 1903 Walter Emden became the 4th Mayor of Westminster, before becoming the Mayor of Dover in November 1907 under somewhat unusual circumstances. He was the first mayor not to be a member of the Town Council, and was elected under a special provision of the Municipal Corporations Act enabling a duly qualified burgess to take the position.

An energetic mayor, he was a driving force in promoting the Dover Pageant of 1908, and it was around this time that he bought a controlling interest in A.L Thomas & Sons Ltd, an iron foundry based in Dover that specialised in the manufacture and supply of fencing, pipes and manhole covers.  Emden put his nephew, Vivian Elkington, in charge of the firm, which was renamed The Dover Engineering Works Ltd on September 3, 1909, and eventually became famous for the manufacture of iron gas and airtight inspection covers, still manufactured and supplied across the globe by the same company today, although under a different name (Gatic).

Legacy
The Guide to British Theatres describes Emden's early work as "the epitome of architectural illiteracy" betraying his lack of formal training in architecture. He benefited from his collaborations and the Guide describes  a "well behaved, precise quality to Emden's later work which properly reflects his social achievements in the world of affairs" Sadly, theatre and music-hall design was not accorded the same accolades accorded to civic and church architecture when they were built, it was not until the late 20th century that they were accorded any importance and many of Emden's surviving buildings have now been listed as being of architectural significance.

He formally retired in 1906, passing the practice to Emden, Egan and Co., a partnership formed from his four principal assistants; Stephen H. Egan, William S. Emden, A. J. Croughton and T. C. Overtone. They remained in offices in Lancaster Place, off the Strand and designed many suburban London cinemas and hotels, including the iconic "State Cinema" (1910) in Leytonstone. Most of these large cinemas have now succumbed, as music-hall did to them, to television and been modified to other uses, or demolished. Emden died in London in 1913.

Theatres
His list of theatre designs include:

References

Theatre London: An Architectural Guide, Edwin Heathcote, 
Guide to British Theatres 1750-1950, Earl, John and Michael Sell pp. 272–273 (Theatres Trust, 2000)

External links
Corporation of London page on Walter Emden (Principally drawn from Earl and Sell (2000)
List of London Theatres and their history
Theatre Trust dBase
London Theatreland History
Ireland Theatre history Index
List of British Theatre Architects
Royal Court theatre

1847 births
1913 deaths
English theatre architects
Members of London County Council
People from Westminster